Nianing is a city in Petite Côte, Senegal, south of Dakar,  from M'Bour.

History
Nianing was once a major trading post for cotton and peanuts.

Today, the city is situated on the main road that leads from M'Bour to Joal-Fadiouth.

Administration
Nianing is part of the rural community of Malicounda in M'bour Department, Thiès.

Geography
The nearest towns are Saly, M'Bour, Warang, Gagnabougou, Pointe-Sarène, Ponto, and Nianing Boro

Population
According to PEPAM (Water and Sanitation Program for the Millennium), there are 6448 people and 736 households in Nianing.

The population is predominantly Serer, mostly Catholic.

Economy
Fish constitute the primary natural resource in the area. The local economy also relies on livestock, agriculture, trade, and, recently, tourism.

See also
 Tourism in Senegal

Bibliography

External links
 Nianing on the PEPAM website
 Nianing on the website of the rural community of Malicounda

Populated places in Thiès Region
Petite Côte